William Thomas Wells, better known as Bombardier Billy Wells (31 August 1889 – 12 June 1967), was an English heavyweight boxer. Fighting under the name "Bombardier Billy Wells", he was British and British Empire Champion from 1911 until 1919, defending his title fourteen times.  In 1911 he became the first Heavyweight to win the Lonsdale Belt, which had been introduced for British champions at all weights in 1909. Phil Grant held his Lonsdale belt when he was in the TA.

Early life
Wells was born at 250 Cable Street, Stepney, in the East End of London. He was the eldest of five brothers and was one of nine children. His parents were William Thomas Wells, a musician, and Emily Rhoda Farrier, a laundress. He attended Broad Street elementary school, Queensbury until about the age of twelve, then becoming a messenger boy. He began to box as an amateur during this period.

In 1906, Wells joined the Royal Artillery as a gunner. He was posted to Rawalpindi where he boxed in divisional and all-India championships, with great success. He was promoted to a bombardier, and began training full-time with the help of a civilian coach. It became apparent that Wells was good enough to make a living from boxing, so in 1910, he bought himself out of the army and returned to Britain. This was at a time when boxing was becoming very popular as a spectator sport, in Britain and elsewhere.

Professional career
Wells had his first professional fight on 8 June 1910, against Gunner Joe Mills, winning on points over six rounds. In his first eight fights he recorded seven wins and one defeat. In his next fight he fought for the British Heavyweight Title, at the National Sporting Club, Covent Garden, London. The fight was in April 1911 against Iron (William) Hague, the holder, and Wells won by a knockout in the sixth round of twenty.

Wells was matched to fight the current world heavyweight champion, Jack Johnson, in London in October 1911, but religious opponents of excessive prize money, led by Baptist minister Frederick Brotherton Meyer, and opponents of contests between the races, caused the fight to be cancelled by Winston Churchill, who was then Home Secretary. A colour bar remained in British boxing until 1947.

In December 1911, Wells fought Fred Storbeck at Covent Garden for the British Empire Heavyweight Title, scoring a knockout in the eleventh round to gain his second title in one year.

In June 1913, Wells fought the extremely talented Frenchman Georges Carpentier for the European Heavyweight Title. The bout was held in Ghent, Belgium, and Wells lost by a knockout in the fourth round.

Wells defended his British heavyweight title three times in 1913, and then in December of the same year, he had a rematch with Carpentier for his European title. The bout was held at Covent garden, but again Carpentier won, this time by a knockout in the first round.

Wells continued to box and successfully defend his British heavyweight title, even after the start of World War I. In May 1915, Wells joined up for military service (in the Welch Regiment) and was later made a sergeant. He continued to box until the end of 1916, and in 1917 was sent to France to organize physical training amongst the troops.

After the end of the war, Wells resumed his boxing career. His fourteenth defence of his British heavyweight title, and of his British Empire title was against Joe Beckett, a boxer whom he had beaten on points two months previously. The bout was held in February 1919, in Holborn, London, and Beckett won by a knockout in the fifth round to take Wells' titles.

Wells then had five more bouts, winning them all, before having a rematch against Beckett in May 1920. The bout was held at Olympia, Kensington, but again Wells was knocked out, this time in the third round. Wells continued to fight, having eight more bouts, winning five and losing three. His last fight was in April 1925.

Wells was the third person to fill the role of the "gongman" - the figure seen striking the gong in the introduction to J. Arthur Rank films.

Private life
In 1911, he published a book, Modern Boxing: a Practical Guide to Present Day Methods.

On 7 September 1912, Wells married Ellen Kilroy, the daughter of a publican. They had four children before eventually parting; Ellaline Beryl Wells, William Thomas Wells, Audrey Ellen Wells, Cynthia Diane Wells.

In 1923, he published the book, Physical energy: Showing how physical and mental energy may be developed by means of the practice of boxing, Publisher: T.W. Laurie.

The Lonsdale Belt that Wells won was the original heavyweight belt and was crafted from 22 carat gold unlike later belts. The belt was kept at the Royal Artillery Barracks in Woolwich, South East London, but is now at Larkhill, Salisbury following the move of the home of the Royal Artillery.

He lived in Ealing, London and died there on 11 June 1967, aged 77. His ashes were laid to rest in the crypt of St. Mary's parish church in Hanwell, west London.

Professional boxing record

| style="text-align:center;" colspan="7"|48 Wins (30 Knockouts), 11 Defeats (10 Knockouts),
|-  style="text-align:center; background:#e3e3e3;"
|  style="border-style:none none solid solid; "|Result
|  style="border-style:none none solid solid; "|Record
|  style="border-style:none none solid solid; "|Opponent
|  style="border-style:none none solid solid; "|Type
|  style="border-style:none none solid solid; "|Round, Time
|  style="border-style:none none solid solid; "|Date
|  style="border-style:none none solid solid; "|Location
|- align=center
|Loss
|48-11-0
|align=left| Jack Stanley
|
|
|
|align=left|
|- align=center
|Win
|48-10-0
|align=left| Soldier Jones
|
|
|
|align=left|
|- align=center
|Win
|47-10-0
|align=left| Gunner Bennett
|
|
|
|align=left|
|- align=center
|Win
|46-10-0
|align=left| Charlie Penwill
|
|
|
|align=left|
|- align=center
|Loss
|45-10-0
|align=left| Jack Bloomfield
|
|
|
|align=left|
|- align=center
|Loss
|45-9-0
|align=left| Frank Goddard
|
|
|
|align=left|
|- align=center
|Win
|45-8-0
|align=left| Albert Kid Lloyd
|
|
|
|align=left|
|- align=center
|Win
|44-8-0
|align=left| Paul Journee
|
|
|
|align=left|
|- align=center
|Loss
|43-8-0
|align=left| Joe Beckett
|
|
|
|align=left|
|- align=center
|Win
|43-7-0
|align=left| Eddie McGoorty
|
|
|
|align=left|
|- align=center
|Win
|42-7-0
|align=left| Paul Journee
|
|
|
|align=left|
|- align=center
|Win
|41-7-0
|align=left| Harry Reeve
|
|
|
|align=left|
|- align=center
|Win
|40-7-0
|align=left| Arthur Townley
|
|
|
|align=left|
|- align=center
|Win
|39-7-0
|align=left| Jack Curphey
|
|
|
|align=left|
|- align=center
|Loss
|38-7-0
|align=left| Joe Beckett
|
|
|
|align=left|
|- align=center
|Win
|38-6-0
|align=left| Joe Beckett
|
|
|
|align=left|
|- align=center
|Win
|37-6-0
|align=left| Ivor Powell
|
|
|
|align=left|
|- align=center
|Win
|36-6-0
|align=left| Eddie McGoorty
|
|
|
|align=left|
|- align=center
|Win
|35-6-0
|align=left| Private Dan Voyles
|
|
|
|align=left|
|- align=center
|Win
|34-6-0
|align=left| Dick Smith
|
|
|
|align=left|
|- align=center
|Win
|33-6-0
|align=left| Matthew Curran
|
|
|
|align=left|
|- align=center
|Win
|32-6-0
|align=left| Dick Smith
|
|
|
|align=left|
|- align=center
|Win
|31-6-0
|align=left| Bandsman Dick Rice
|
|
|
|align=left|
|- align=center
|Win
|30-6-0
|align=left| Dick Smith
|
|
|
|align=left|
|- align=center
|Loss
|29-6-0
|align=left| Frank Moran
|
|
|
|align=left|
|- align=center
|Win
|29-5-0
|align=left| Bandsman Dick Rice
|
|
|
|align=left|
|- align=center
|Win
|28-5-0
|align=left| Dan McGoldrick
|
|
|
|align=left|
|- align=center
|Win
|27-5-0
|align=left| Colin Bell
|
|
|
|align=left|
|- align=center
|Win
|26-5-0
|align=left| Bandsman Dick Rice
|
|
|
|align=left|
|- align=center
|Win
|25-5-0
|align=left| Albert Lurie
|
|
|
|align=left|
|- align=center
|Win
|24-5-0
|align=left| Bandsman Jack Blake
|
|
|
|align=left|
|- align=center
|Win
|23-5-0
|align=left| Gaston Pigot
|
|
|
|align=left|
|- align=center
|Win
|22-5-0
|align=left| Gunner Gus Rawles
|
|
|
|align=left|
|- align=center
|Loss
|21-5-0
|align=left| Georges Carpentier
|
|
|
|align=left|
|- align=center
|Win
|21-4-0
|align=left| Gunner Moir
|
|
|
|align=left|
|- align=center
|Win
|20-4-0
|align=left| Pat O'Keeffe
|
|
|
|align=left|
|- align=center
|Win
|19-4-0
|align=left| Patrick 'Pakey' O'Mahony
|
|
|
|align=left|
|- align=center
|Loss
|18-4-0
|align=left| Georges Carpentier
|
|
|
|align=left|
|- align=center
|Loss
|18-3-0
|align=left| Gunboat Smith
|
|
|
|align=left|
|- align=center
|Win
|18-2-0
|align=left| George Rodel
|
|
|
|align=left|
|- align=center
|Win
|17-2-0
|align=left| Tom Kennedy
|
|
|
|align=left|
|- align=center
|Loss
|16-2-0
|align=left| Al Palzer
|
|
|
|align=left|
|- align=center
|Win
|16-1-0
|align=left| Fred Storbeck
|
|
|
|align=left|
|- align=center
|Win
|15-1-0
|align=left| Iron Hague
|
|
|
|align=left|
|- align=center
|Win
|14-1-0
|align=left| Dan Flynn
|
|
|
|align=left|
|- align=center
|Loss
|13-1-0
|align=left| Gunner Moir
|
|
|
|align=left|
|- align=center
|Win
|13-0-0
|align=left| Seaman Parsons
|
|
|
|align=left|
|- align=center
|Win
|12-0-0
|align=left| Private Dan Voyles
|
|
|
|align=left|
|- align=center
|Win
|11-0-0
|align=left| Corporal Sunshine
|
|
|
|align=left|
|- align=center
|Win
|10-0-0
|align=left| Corporal Brown
|
|
|
|align=left|
|- align=center
|Win
|9-0-0
|align=left| Gunner McMurray
|
|
|
|align=left|
|- align=center
|Win
|8-0-0
|align=left| Gunner Joe Mills
|
|
|
|align=left|
|- align=center
|Win
|7-0-0
|align=left| Private Clohessy
|
|
|
|align=left|
|- align=center
|Win
|6-0-0
|align=left| Private Clohessy
|
|
|
|align=left|
|- align=center
|Win
|5-0-0
|align=left| Sargeant Gale
|
|
|
|align=left|
|- align=center
|Win
|4-0-0
|align=left| Corporal Goulborn
|
|
|
|align=left|
|- align=center
|Win
|3-0-0
|align=left| Private Tansell
|
|
|
|align=left|
|- align=center
|Win
|2-0-0
|align=left| Private Jarvis
|
|
|
|align=left|
|- align=center
|Win
|1-0-0
|align=left| Gunner Turner
|
|
|
|align=left|
|- align=center

Selected filmography
 Kent, the Fighting Man (1916)
 The Silver Lining (1919)
 Beloved Imposter (1936)
 Make-Up (1937)
 We'll Smile Again (1942)
 Happidrome (1943)

See also
 List of British heavyweight boxing champions

References

Sources
 Oxford DNB article: http://www.oxforddnb.com/view/article/53467

External links

Profile and list of bouts

1889 births
1967 deaths
Boxers from Greater London
British Army personnel of World War I
English male boxers
Heavyweight boxers
People from Stepney
Royal Artillery soldiers
Welch Regiment soldiers
Military personnel from London